Petrus Benedicti Oelandus (1531–1606) also called Ölandus was a Swedish prelate who was the Bishop of Linköping from 1589 till 1606.

References

 1531 births
 1606 deaths
Bishops of Linköping
Lutheran bishops of Linköping